Rhododendron wardii (黄杯杜鹃) is a rhododendron species native to southwestern Sichuan, southeastern Xizang, and northwestern Yunnan in China, where it grows at altitudes of . The flowers are yellow or white.

Synonyms
 Rhododendron astrocalyx 
 Rhododendron croceum 
 Rhododendron gloeblastum 
 Rhododendron litiense 
 Rhododendron oresterum 
 Rhododendron prasinocalyx

References
 "Rhododendron wardii", W. W. Smith, Notes Roy. Bot. Gard. Edinburgh. 8: 205. 1914.

wardii